Finishing Line (出人头地) is a Singaporean Chinese drama series produced by the former Singapore Broadcasting Corporation (SBC) in 1990. The story begins in 1983 and follows a group of friends as they grow up and forge their own paths in adulthood.

Cast
Edmund Chen as Zhong Chongguang 钟重光
Li Nanxing as Xia Dejian 夏德建
Aileen Tan as Xia Miaoran 夏妙然
Zoe Tay as Ye Bei 叶蓓
Zhuo Mingshun 卓铭顺 as Huang Haiwen 黄海文
Bryan Chan as Feng Tai 冯泰
Liang Weidong 梁维东 as Lin Gengsheng 林更生
Hu Shuxian 胡菽贤 as Zhu Shaowen 朱少文
Cai Du Cui 蔡笃翠 as Zhou Suna 周素娜
Wu Weiqiang 邬伟强 as Ye Rongzong 叶荣宗
Tan Mui Kwang 陈美光 as Hong Wanfang 洪婉芳
Zhou Quanxi 周全喜 as Xia Zhuoshang 夏卓裳
Zhang Wenxiang 张文祥 as Luo Hao 罗浩
Yan Bingliang as Zhong Jiping 钟济平
Chen Meng 陈濛 as Chen Ah Huan 陈阿欢
Zeng Sipei 曾思佩 as Chen Ah Ai 陈阿爱
Zhou Shiqiang 周世强 as Lin Xiangnan 林向南

External links
新传媒华文戏剧列表 MediaCorp Chinese Dramas Over The Years
Theme Song on YouTube

Singapore Chinese dramas